Pottery Bank is a  district of Walker, Newcastle upon Tyne,  England, south of Walker Road to the River Tyne between Church Street and Everstone Gardens.

References 

Districts of Newcastle upon Tyne